The French submarine Requin was the lead ship of the s built for the French Navy in the mid-1920s. Laid down in June 1922, it was launched in July 1924 and commissioned in May 1926. It was captured by Italian forces at Bizerte, Tunisia on 8 December 1942 and renamed FR 113. On 9 September 1943, it was recaptured by German forces. It was sold for scrap in Genes, Italy in 1944.

Design
Propulsion while surfaced was provided by two  diesel motors and two  electric motors.

References 

World War II submarines of France
Requin-class submarines